The Glenarm Power Plant is a power plant in Pasadena, California that began operating on July 4, 1907.

Overview
The Glenarm Power Plant is an Art Deco style power plant in Pasadena, California. The Power Plant has powered the City of Pasadena since July 4, 1907. The power plant has been expanded over time and has included a total of 17 different power generation units. The  site contains four simple-cycle gas turbine generating units, GT-1 through GT-4, and one combined cycle generating unit, GT-5. The Glenarm Plant is to the west of the Metro L Line tracks that bisect the site while the Broadway Plant is on the east side. The plant is bordered on the east by the northern terminus of the Pasadena Freeway and Blair International Baccalaureate School.

History
In the 1900s Pasadena was a pioneer in municipal lighting, and its conflict with Edison Electric Company (later Southern California Edison) gaining national attention. Mayor of Pasadena, William Waterhouse, upset with Edison's unsatisfactory service and high price for electricity, refused to pay the bill. Soon afterward the City Board decided to start a municipal lighting system and Pasadena issued a bond to finance street lighting. Pasadena Water and Power's (PWP) history begins when The Municipal Light and Power Department was set up in 1906. Pasadena citizens passed a $125,000 bond to build a power plant that would electrify street lights for less that what Edison charged at the time.

On October 16, 2012, the Pratt and Whitney turbine in GT-2 failed, apparently due to breakage of a blade in the power turbine, causing a fire but no injuries. Units GT-1, GT-3, and B-3 were already offline for repairs, leaving the station with only the 45 MW GT-4 unit. The B-3 steam unit was brought back online a few days later.

Glenarm Repowering
On June 2, 2014, the Pasadena City Council endorsed the development contract to add GT-5, with commercial activity slated to start in June 2016. The unit would be an efficient, 71 MW General Electric LM6000 combined cycle power unit. The new unit, GT-5, was proposed to replace the outdated Unit B-3, situated on the Broadway side of the Power Plant. B-3 was touted as the U.S's. most-efficient unit when it entered benefit in 1965, however GT-5 would be almost twice as effective as the old steam boiler equipment. A formal ground breaking event took place on July 2, 2014 where work was to begin rapidly.

The new gas turbine, GT-5, was introduced as a part of a $132 million re-powering project at Glenarm. After, lawsuits, substantial rain and a bigger than-anticipated design delay in May 2016 it was completed. The turbine gives a steady wellspring of reinforcement control that allows Pasadena Water and Power to incorporate more renewable but intermittent energy, for example, solar and wind also offers a quick-start capability that can generate power within minutes instead of the 72-hour start up time required for the old framework.

Filming
The site has been a popular filming location.

Music Videos Appearances:

Janet Jackson Rhythm Nation (music video)

Quiet Riot The Wild And The Young

Michael Jackson Moonwalker

Movie Appearances:

2015 Freaks of Nature

2011 In Time

A Nightmare on Elm Street

Television Appearances:

Criminal Minds, SEAL Team, The Newsroom

References

External links
 Photos of the site, from 1906-current
 The History of PWP

Fossil fuel power stations in the United States
Natural gas-fired power stations in California
Buildings and structures in Pasadena, California
Art Deco architecture in California
Energy infrastructure completed in 1907
Energy infrastructure completed in 2016
1907 establishments in California